Da'an is a district of the city of Zigong, Sichuan province, People's Republic of China.

References

External links
Da'an District Government website 

Districts of Sichuan
Zigong